Panaro may refer to:

Places
Panaro (river), river in Italy
Savignano sul Panaro, a municipality in Modena, Italy
San Cesario sul Panaro, a municipality in Modena, Italy
Marano sul Panaro, a municipality in Modena, Italy
San Felice sul Panaro, a municipality in Modeno, Italy

People
Hugh Panaro (born 1964), American tenor singer
Alessandra Panaro (1939–2019), Italian film actress
Nicola Panaro (born 1968), Italian camorrista

Other
Battle of the Panaro, Battle on the banks of the Panaro river during the Neapolitan war in 1812